Ralph Moody (September 10, 1917 – June 9, 2004) was an American stock car racer. He eventually became a team co-owner of Holman Moody.

Background
He built his first Model T Ford race car in 1935, and ran it on nights and weekends. He served in the U.S. Army in World War II, and drove a tank under the command of General George S. Patton. He married his wife Mitzi in 1949, and they moved to Florida so that he could race all year.

While still living in Massachusetts, after World War II, Ralph Moody was an active midget chauffeur in the now-defunct Bay State Midget Racing Association.

NASCAR career
Moody won four races in 1956 for owner Pete DePaolo. He finished eighth in the final points, with 21 Top-10 finishes in 35 races.

He raced the first third of 1957 until Ford and the other American automobile manufacturers pulled out of racing.

Partnership with John Holman

Mr. Moody immediately took out a loan against an airplane he owned, and he and John Holman paid $12,000 to buy the shop and equipment that had been Ford's Charlotte-based racing operation.

Holman Moody began as a racecar owner operation but became more famous for their racecar building operation. Holman Moody chassis featured improvements such as tube shocks, square tubing frames, and rear ends with floater housings. They built around 50 race cars a year until Moody sold his portion of the company after the 1971 season. They had won 92 NASCAR Grand National races.

Ralph Moody, Inc.
He then opened Ralph Moody Inc. in Charlotte. He built race engines and race cars and did research and development of high mileage automobiles at that site for several years.

List of Halls of Fame inductions
North Carolina Auto Racing Hall of Fame in 2003
National Motorsports Press Association Stock Car Racing Hall of Fame in 1990
International Motorsports Hall of Fame in 1994
Motorsports Hall of Fame of America in 2005
New England Auto Racers Hall of Fame in 2000
Drag Racing Hall of Fame
Old Timers Hall of Fame

References

External links
Article on Ralph Moody at ThatsRacin.com, link dead on March 8, 2007
International Motorsports Hall of Fame
Holman Moody Website

Holman-Moody Owner's statistics at racing-reference.info
Biography at New England Auto Racers Hall of Fame
Obituary, link dead March 8, 2007

1917 births
2004 deaths
United States Army personnel of World War II
Burials in North Carolina
NASCAR drivers
NASCAR team owners
People from Taunton, Massachusetts
Racing drivers from Massachusetts
USAC Stock Car drivers